Liana K may refer to:

People
Liana Kanelli, Greek actress, TV and radio host, journalist and politician
Liana Kerzner, Canadian YouTuber
Liana K. Ramirez, actress and dancer